Metaphya tillyardi is a species of dragonfly in the family Corduliidae, known as an offshore emerald. 
It has been found on Bramble Cay, near the Papuan coast; its habitats are unknown.

Metaphya tillyardi is a slim and short-bodied, metallic dragonfly with strong markings.

Gallery

References

Corduliidae
Odonata of Oceania
Odonata of Asia
Insects of New Guinea
Insects of Indonesia
Insects of Southeast Asia
Insects of New Caledonia
Taxa named by Friedrich Ris
Insects described in 1913